The Incident is the tenth studio album by British progressive rock band Porcupine Tree. It was released as a double album on 14 September 2009 by Roadrunner Records. The record was nominated for a Grammy Award for Best Surround Sound Album and reached the Top 25 on both the US and UK album charts. It was the final release to feature Colin Edwin on bass as well as the last one from the band before an extended hiatus that lasted until 2021.

History
The band started recording the album in February 2009. This was confirmed by a post on their official website: "Writing for the next PT studio record is well underway, with the band recently spending 2 weeks scheduled in the English countryside working on new tracks. Recording of these pieces and a new 35-minute song cycle [written by Steven Wilson] were due to start in February..." A tour was announced on the band's website and MySpace, along with dates, following release of the new album. Around March and April, Wilson commented that the 35-minute song kept evolving, becoming a 55-minute song occupying the entire disc.

On 12 June 2009, details of The Incident were revealed on the Porcupine Tree website: "the record is set to be released via Roadrunner Records worldwide on 22 September as a double CD: the centre-piece is the title track, which takes up the whole of the first disc. The 55-minute work is described as a slightly surreal song cycle about beginnings and endings and the sense that 'after this, things will never be the same again'; the release date was later moved to 15 September. The self-produced album is completed by four standalone compositions that developed out of band writing sessions last December - Flicker, Bonnie the Cat, Black Dahlia, and Remember Me Lover feature on a separate EP length disc to stress their independence from the song cycle." On 13 July, the first preview of the album was posted at both Roadrunner and the band's MySpace pages. The track "Time Flies", described by Wilson as "sentimental" and the "centerpiece" of the album, became a music video directed by usual Porcupine Tree collaborator Lasse Hoile, along with an edited single.

A DVD-A edition was released on the Transmission Label as Transmission 11.1 through Burning Shed. On 12 April 2010, an acoustic version of "I Drive the Hearse" was released through the Roadrunner website. On 9 July 2010, a music video for "Bonnie the Cat" was published.

The chord progression in several songs on the record, particularly parts of "The Blind House" and "The Séance", is reused from the No-Man song "The Break-Up For Real" (from 2003's Together We're Stranger).

Concept
The concept for The Incident emerged as Wilson was caught in a motorway traffic jam whilst driving past a road accident:

Reception

In January 2010, Eclipsed magazine critics named The Incident their "Album of the Year" and also gave credit to the band for "Best Concert of The Year", while "Time Flies" reached #5 in the "Best Song of the Year" category.

Readers of the Teraz Rock Polish magazine voted Steven Wilson as the "Best Foreign Instrumentalist/Musician of 2009", surpassing other widely known artists, such as The Edge, Jerry Cantrell, Jack White, Kerry King, Kirk Hammett, Tom Morello, Mark Knopfler, and Omar Rodríguez-López.

Classic Rock magazine critics voted Porcupine Tree #1 "Best Band" and The Incident as #1 "Album of the Year"; The Incident tour was voted #4 and Gavin Harrison gained second place for "Best Drummer"; Steven Wilson achieved #4 as "Best Guitarist" and was chosen #1 "Prog Icon of 2009".

Once again, a Porcupine Tree song was chosen "Song of the Day" by NPR. "Drawing the Line" is the second NPR pick from the band since "Sentimental", off 2007's Fear of a Blank Planet.

Indian newspaper The Hindu commented on "Time Flies" by asserting, "The epic 11-minute track is simply one of Porcupine Tree's best. Embodied in melodic simplicity with a rhythmic strumming pattern, the piece undulates with cascading crescendos, a rumbling mid-section and a propulsive finish."

Track listing

Disc one
The first disc of the album was intended to be a single 55-minute song, but it is segmented into 14 sequential tracks.
All lyrics written by Steven Wilson.

Disc two
Disc 2 contains tracks recorded outside the song cycle.
All lyrics written by Steven Wilson.

These two bonus tracks were recorded in Tilburg, The Netherlands, in 2008 for the live DVD Anesthetize.

DVD-A edition

Personnel

Porcupine Tree
 Porcupine Tree - arrangements
 Steven Wilson - vocals, guitars, keyboards; mixing
 Colin Edwin - bass; double bass
 Richard Barbieri - synthesizers, keyboards
 Gavin Harrison - drums, percussion

Production
 Engineers: Steve Orchard, John Wesley (engineered guitars)
 Mastering: Jon Astley (stereo), Darcy Proper (5.1)

Charts

References

Porcupine Tree albums
2009 albums
Concept albums
Roadrunner Records albums